Russell Ciochon (born March 11, 1948) is an American paleoanthropologist. He was born in Altadena, California and received three degrees (B.A. in 1971; M.A. in 1974; and PhD. in 1986) in anthropology from the University of California, Berkeley. He is currently a professor of anthropology at the University of Iowa. He is known primarily for his research into Gigantopithecus.

Awards and honors
 1971 - Phi Beta Kappa
 1972-1976 - U.S. National Institutes of Health (NIGMS) Predoctoral Fellowship
 1986 - American Men and Women of Science
 1990-1993 - University of Iowa Faculty Scholar Award
 1992 - Who’s Who in Science and Engineering
 1995 - Who’s Who in the World
 1999 - International Authors and Writers Who's Who
 2001 - Fellow National, The Explorer's Club, New York

Television appearances 

He has appeared in the documentaries: Sasquatch: Legend Meets Science on the Discovery Channel, and most recently on Giganto: The Real King Kong which aired on The History Channel. Both of those shows dealt with Gigantopithecus, one of Ciochon's specialties.

External links
 Russell Ciochon's Bioanthropology Website
 Russell Ciochon's Faculty Members page at the University of Iowa site
 Russell Ciochon's Curriculum Vitae

References

American anthropologists
American paleoanthropologists
1948 births
Living people
University of Iowa faculty
UC Berkeley College of Letters and Science alumni
Fellows of the Explorers Club
People from Altadena, California